The Karl Stefan Memorial Airport Administration Building at the Norfolk Municipal Airport in Norfolk in Madison County, Nebraska was built in 1946.  It was listed on the National Register of Historic Places in 2002.

It was designed by Norfolk architect Elbert B. Watson (1879-1963) in Moderne style.  It has also been known as Norfolk Municipal Airport Administration Building.

Watson also designed the Athletic Park Band Shell in Plainview, Nebraska, also NRHP-listed in Madison County, and the NRHP-listed Knox County Courthouse in Center, Nebraska, and the Rock County Courthouse in Bassett, Nebraska.

References

Government buildings on the National Register of Historic Places in Nebraska
Streamline Moderne architecture in the United States
Buildings and structures completed in 1946
National Register of Historic Places in Madison County, Nebraska